Charles Sylvester Butler (March 29, 1870 – May 26, 1946) was an American physician and politician from New York.

Life 
Butler was born on March 29, 1870 in Colesville, New York, the son of Dr. Andrew J. Butler and Mary J. Booth.

Butler attended Windsor High School and studied medicine with his father. He graduated from Albany Medical College in 1895. After graduating, he assisted his father's practice. He then moved to Nineveh. In 1898, after taking a course in the Polyclinic, he returned to Nineveh and was appointed surgeon of the Delaware & Hudson Railroad. In 1903, he moved to Harpursville.

In 1906, Butler was elected a coroner for Broome County. He held that office for three years and declined a nomination for a second term. In 1910, he was elected to the New York State Assembly as a Republican, representing Broome County. He served in the Assembly in 1911. He lost the 1911 re-election to the Assembly to Democratic candidate Arthur J. Ruland. He later moved to Binghamton. He practiced medicine there until his retirement in 1936. He resumed his medical practice during World War II.

Butler was a member of the Freemasons, the Royal Arch Masonry, the Improved Order of Red Men, and Phi Sigma Kappa. In 1899, he married Jessie Bushnell. By the time he died, he was married to E. Irene. His children were Andrew Payson, Charles Butler, and Thomas Wright.

Butler died in the City Hospital from bladder cancer on May 26, 1946. He was buried in Spring Forest Cemetery.

References

External links 

 The Political Graveyard

1870 births
1946 deaths
People from Colesville, New York
Politicians from Binghamton, New York
Albany Medical College alumni
19th-century American physicians
20th-century American physicians
Physicians from New York (state)
20th-century American politicians
Republican Party members of the New York State Assembly
American Freemasons
Deaths from bladder cancer
Deaths from cancer in New York (state)
Burials in New York (state)